Molls Donald Ntchamda (born 14 July 1998) is a Cameroonian professional footballer who plays as a midfielder for Serbian SuperLiga club Kolubara.

Club career

Borac Banja Luka
In February 2021, Molls signed for Bosnian club Borac Banja Luka. In July 2022, Molls left the club.

Najran
On 25 July 2022, Molls signed for Najran.

Kolubara
In January 2023, Molls signed for Serbian club Kolubara.

Career statistics

Club

References

1998 births
Living people
Cameroonian footballers
Association football midfielders
NK Lokomotiva Zagreb players
NK Kustošija players
FK Borac Banja Luka players
Najran SC players
FK Kolubara players
First Football League (Croatia) players
Premier League of Bosnia and Herzegovina players
Saudi First Division League players
Serbian SuperLiga players
Expatriate footballers in Croatia
Expatriate footballers in Bosnia and Herzegovina
Expatriate footballers in Saudi Arabia
Expatriate footballers in Serbia
Cameroonian expatriate sportspeople in Croatia
Cameroonian expatriate sportspeople in Saudi Arabia
Cameroonian expatriate sportspeople in Serbia